Nur Mohammad is a politician from Munshiganj District of Bangladesh. He was elected member of parliament for Munshiganj-4 in the 1988 Bangladeshi general election.

Career 
Nur Mohammad was elected member of parliament for the Munshiganj-4 constituency as an Jatiya Party candidate in the 1988 Bangladeshi general election.

References 

Living people
Year of birth missing (living people)
People from Munshiganj District
Jatiya Party (Ershad) politicians
4th Jatiya Sangsad members